St. Louis Woman is a 1934 American pre-Code musical drama film directed by Albert Ray and starring Jeanette Loff, Johnny Mack Brown and Earle Foxe. It is also known by the alternative title of Missouri Nightingale.

Plot
After being expelled from college for spending time at a nightclub, a glamorous singer persuades her boyfriend to give him a job on a professional football team. He soon falls in love with her and forgets about his own girlfriend.

Cast
 Jeanette Loff as Lou Morrison, the St. Louis Woman  
 Johnny Mack Brown as Jim Warren 
 Earle Foxe as Harry Crandall  
 Roberta Gale as Eleanor Farnham  
 Dareece Murphy as Beezy  
 Eddie Clayton as Musician 
 Sterrett Ford as Owner 
 Tom London as Lions Coach Ryan  
 Blackie Whiteford as First Joe  
 Louise Holden as Mrs. Warren  
 Wilbur Higby as Mr. Warren  
 Bruce Mitchell as Detective  
 Bernie Lamont as Thug  
 Oscar 'Dutch' Hendrian as Thug  
 Robert McKenzie as Team Trainer  
 Harrison Greene as Man in Soup Line  
 Ed Porter as Joe Proctor

References

Bibliography
 Pitts, Michael R. Poverty Row Studios, 1929–1940: An Illustrated History of 55 Independent Film Companies, with a Filmography for Each. McFarland & Company, 2005.

External links
 

1934 films
1930s musical drama films
American musical drama films
Films directed by Albert Ray
American sports drama films
1930s sports drama films
American football films
American black-and-white films
1934 drama films
1930s English-language films
1930s American films